The Rural Municipality of Wheatlands No. 163 is a rural municipality (RM) in the Canadian province of Saskatchewan within Census Division No. 7 and  Division No. 2. It is located in the southwest portion of the province.

History 
The RM of Wheatlands No. 163 incorporated as a rural municipality on December 13, 1909.

Demographics 

Geography 
The Coteau Hills in the RM taper off to agricultural plains. The burrowing owl (athene cunicularia), an endangered animal, makes its home in this area.

Communities and localities 
The following unincorporated communities are within the RM.

Localities
Mortlach
Parkbeg

Government 
The RM of Wheatlands No. 163 is governed by an elected municipal council and an appointed administrator that meets on the second Wednesday of every month. The reeve of the RM is Andy Bossence while its administrator is Julie Gerbrandt. The RM's office is located in Mortlach.

References 

Wheatlands
Division No. 7, Saskatchewan